Gigi Fernández and Natasha Zvereva were the defending champions and won in the final 7–6, 6–3 against Mariaan de Swardt and Irina Spîrlea.

Seeds
Champion seeds are indicated in bold text while text in italics indicates the round in which those seeds were eliminated.

 Gigi Fernández /  Natasha Zvereva (champions)
 Nicole Arendt /  Manon Bollegraf (semifinals)
 Brenda Schultz-McCarthy /  Rennae Stubbs (quarterfinals)
 Lindsay Davenport /  Conchita Martínez (first round)

Draw

External links
 1996 Toray Pan Pacific Open Doubles Draw

Pan Pacific Open
Toray Pan Pacific Open
1996 Toray Pan Pacific Open